Molly Smith is an American theatre director and the artistic director of Arena Stage in Washington, D.C. She was formerly artistic director of the Perseverance Theatre in Juneau, Alaska, which she founded in 1979 and led until 1998.

Biography
Smith attended Catholic University (Washington, D.C.), received a master's degree in theatre from the American University in Washington, D.C., in 1978 and spent the next 18 years at Perseverance Theatre.
 
In 1998, Smith became Artistic Director of Arena Stage. Interested in encouraging new American plays, she founded Arena's "downstairs series," which has held readings and workshopped some sixty plays, many of which have gone on to full productions.

Smith commissioned numerous world premieres at the Perseverance Theatre as well, including Paula Vogel's Pulitzer Prize-winning How I Learned to Drive and The Mineola Twins, Tim Acito’s The Women of Brewster Place, Moises Kaufman’s 33 Variations, Charles Randolph-Wright's Blue, Zora Neale Hurston's lost play, Polk County; and Sarah Ruhl's Passion Play, a cycle.

She has also directed at the Shaw Festival in Canada, Berkeley Repertory Theatre, Trinity Repertory Company, Tarragon Theatre in Toronto, and Centaur Theatre in Montreal, and includes the shows South Pacific, Mack and Mabel, Anna Christie, Cat on a Hot Tin Roof, "The Music Man", and "My Fair Lady".

Smith has served as Literary Adviser to the Sundance Theatre Lab and formed the Arena Stage Writers Council, composed of leading American playwrights. Smith brings artists of international renown to the Arena. She is a member of the Board of the Theatre Communications Group, as well as the Center for International Theatre Development.

She directed two feature films. Raven's Blood (1997) was adapted from the mystery novel, Death of an Alaskan Princess, by Bridget Smith, and filmed in Juneau.<ref name="raven">"'Raven's Blood' opens", Juneau Empire.com, 11 September 1997, 14 February 2013</ref> A major community effort, it featured many local actors and extras. She also directed Making Contact.''

Smith married her longtime partner, Suzanne Blue Star Boy, in a 2014 ceremony officiated by Supreme Court Justice Ruth Bader Ginsburg.

Legacy and honors
Author Paula Vogel said: "To know Molly Smith is to adore her, to work with her is to be inspired, to see her work is to believe in the magic of theatre again."

Smith has received Honorary Doctorates from Towson and American universities.

She organized a march on the Mall for gun control on January 26, 2013.

See also

References

External links
Arena Stage  Arenastage.org

American theatre directors
Women theatre directors
Living people
People from Juneau, Alaska
People from Washington, D.C.
Year of birth missing (living people)